John Smithson (* March 1952) is a British film and television producer.

Family
John's brother is the political blogger Mike Smithson.

Together with David Darlow he co-founded the production company Darlow Smithson Productions in 1988. In June 2002 Smithson acquired full control and bought out Darlow's 50 % stake. A month later Darlow left the company.

Smithson later became joint Creative Director of Arrow Media, based in London. He works closely with top broadcasting commissioners in the UK, US and other key international operating territories around the world.

Awards
1999, Smithson won the News & Documentary Emmy Award for Analysis of a Single Current Story for "Decoding the Nazis" .
2004, Smithson won the Alexander Korda Award for Best British Film for Touching the Void.
2004, Smithson won the British Independent Film Award for Best British Documentary for Touching the Void.
2004, Smithson won the Evening Standard British Film Award Best Film Award for Touching the Void
2005, Smithson was nominated for an Emmy for The Last Dragon in the category of Outstanding Animated Program (For Programming One Hour or More).
2005, Smithson was nominated for the Online Film & Television Association Best Documentary Award for "Touching the Void"
2007, Smithson was nominated for a BAFTA Award for 9/11: The Falling Man in the category of Flaherty Documentary Award.
2007, Smithson won the New York Festival World Gold Medal for Feature-Length Documentary for 9/11: The Falling Man
2007, Smithson won the Grierson Award for Best Cinema Documentary for Deep Water
2007, Smithson won the Focal Award for Best Use of Footage in a Feature Length Documentary or Film for Deep Water
2007, Smithson won the San Diego Film Critics Society Award for Best Documentary for Deep Water.
2007, Smithson won the Rome International Film Festival award for Best Cinema Documentary Deep Water.
2008, Smithson won the International Emmy Award for Best Documentary for The Beckoning Silence.
2009, Smithson was nominated for BAFTA TV Award for Best Single Documentary for The Beckoning Silence.
2009, Smithson was nominated for the BAFTA TV Award for Best Single Documentary Award for Thrilla in Manilla.
2009, Smithson was nominated for the Sundance Film Festival Grand Jury Prize for Thrilla in Manilla World Cinema - Documentary  
2009, Smithson won the Banff Television Festival Award for Best Sports Documentary for Thriller in Manila.
2009, Smithson won the Grierson Award for Best Historical Documentary for Thriller in Manila.
2010, Smithson won the George Foster Peabody Award for Thriller in Manila.
2010, Smithson was nominated for News & Documentary Emmy Award for Outstanding Historical Programming for Thriller in Manila.
2010, Smithson was nominated for International Emmy Award for Best Documentary for 9/11: Phone Calls from the Towers.
2011, Smithson was nominated for an Oscar for Best Motion Picture of the year for 127 Hours.
2011, Smithson was nominated for the BAFTA Alexander Korda Award for Best British Film for 127 Hours.
2011, Smithson won the AFI Awards Movie of the Year Award for 127 Hours.
2011, Smithson was nominated for News & Documentary Emmy Award for Outstanding Historical Programming for Into the Universe with Stephen Hawking, episode "Time Travel".
2012, Smithson was nominated for News & Documentary Emmy Award for Outstanding Informational Programming - Long Form for 9/11: Heroes of the 88th Floor: People Helping People.
2012, Smithson was nominated for an Emmy for Outstanding Science and Technology Programming for Curiosity,  episode "Did God Create the Universe".
2015, Smithson was nominated for an Australian Academy of Cinema and Television Arts Award for Best Feature Length Documentary for Sherpa.
2015, Smithson won the London Film Festival Grierson Award for Best Documentary Film for Sherpa.
2016, Smithson won the Film Critics Australia Award for the Best Feature Length Documentary for Sherpa.
2016, Smithson was nominated for BAFTA Film Awards for the Best Documentary Award for Sherpa.

Selected filmography
 Rough Justice (TV series, 1987) (producer, 2 episodes)
 Tailspin: Behind the Korean Airliner Tragedy (1989) (producer)
 Dead Ahead: The Exxon Valdez Disaster (1992) (producer) 
 Everyman (TV series, 1993-1994) (producer, 3 episodes) 
 The Affair (1995) (producer)
 Black Box (TV series, 1996) (executive producer, 6 episodes) 
 "Station X" (TV documentary, 1999) (executive producer) 
 Touching the Void (2003) (producer) 
 Touching the Void: Return to Siula Grande (2004) (producer)
 The Last Dragon (2004) (executive producer)
 9/11: The Falling Man (2006) (executive producer)
 Deep Water (2006) (producer) 
 Clapham Junction (2007) (producer) 
 The Beckoning Silence (2007) (executive producer)
 Independent Lens (TV series, 2008) (producer, episode "Deep Water")
 Thrilla in Manila (2008) (executive producer)
 The Diary of Anne Frank (TV series, 2009) (executive producer, 5 episodes)
 9//11: Phone Calls from the Towers (TV documentary, 2009) (executive producer)
 U Be Dead (2009) (executive producer)
 Masterpiece Classic (TV series, 2010) (executive producer, episode " The Diary of Anne Frank")
 Into the Universe with Stephen Hawking (TV series, 2010) (executive producer, episode "Time Travel")
 127 Hours (2010) (producer) 
 Curiosity (TV series, 2011) (executive producer, episode " Did God Create the Universe?")
 Stephen Hawking's Grand Design (TV series, 2012) (executive producer, 3 episodes)
 Dog's: Their Secret Lives (TV series, 2013) (executive producer, 4 episodes)
 Ultimate Airport Dubai (TV series, 2014) (executive producer, 19 episodes)
 Sherpa (2015) (producer)
 Secret History (TV series, 2016) (creative director / executive producer, 2 episodes)
 Hitler: The Rise and Fall'' (TV series, 2016) (creative director, 6 episodes)

References

External links
 
 arrowmedia.com

1952 births
Living people
British film producers